New York's 104th State Assembly district is one of the 150 districts in the New York State Assembly. It has been represented by Jonathan Jacobson since 2018, succeeding Frank Skartados.

Geography
District 104 contains portions of Dutchess, Orange and Ulster counties. The towns of Newburgh, Beacon and part of the city of Poughkeepsie is within this district.

Recent election results

2022

2020

2018

2016

2014

2012

References

104
Orange County, New York
Ulster County, New York
Dutchess County, New York